The United States Army CBRN School (USACBRNS), located at Fort Leonard Wood, Missouri, is a primary American training school specializing in military Chemical, Biological, Radiological, and Nuclear (CBRN) defense. until 2008, it was known as the United States Army Chemical School.

Training Facilities

In accordance with U.S. Federal Law, Fort Leonard Wood, Missouri is designated the central location for all of the Department of Defense's CBRN Operations Training and home to the Chemical Corps Regiment. It was moved from Fort McClellan Alabama after the base was closed by the Defense Base Closure and Realignment Commission (BRAC) in 1999.

The Army CBRN School provides numerous courses for officers, Non-commissioned Officers and Initial Entry Soldiers. Numerous international officers also send students to train at the CBRN School.  Additionally, the US Air Force, US Navy, US Coast Guard and US Marine Corps are also maintain training elements at Fort Leonard Wood who, in partnerships with the Army CBRN School, train their personnel in CBRN operations.

Fort Leonard Wood and the Army CBRN School have facilities, in which to conduct training, such as Chemical Defense Training Facility (or CDTF) where military students from across the globe train and become familiar with nerve agents in realistic scenarios, and conduct training with radiological isotopes and inert biological agents. The Edwin R. Bradley Radiological Teaching Laboratories is one of the few radiological teaching laboratories licensed by the NRC in the Department of Defense. It provides a variety of training in radiological and nuclear defense under the supervision of credentialed scientists.

The newest facility at the CBRN School is the Lieutenant Joseph Terry CBRN Training Facility. The US Army CBRN School is the lead for all DOD CBRN Response Training. This facility provides unmatched training opportunities in the fields of CBRN Consequence Management, Hazardous Materials Incident Response, Realistic training venues and other CBRN Response arenas as required. The CBRN School also provides training in Sensitive Site Assessment and Exploitation.

In addition to training, the CBRN School also develops doctrine for Operations, researches and develops materiel requirements, and conducts joint service experimentation as the Joint Combat Developer for the Department of Defense's Chemical and Biological Defense Program.

Official name change
On 11 January 2008, The U.S. Army Chemical School was renamed as The U.S. Army Chemical, Biological, Radiological and Nuclear School (USACBRNS). The name change was to encompass, in the title of the school the wide range of training and expertise maintained by the U.S. Army Chemical Corps.

Command
As of 4 June 2021, the Commandant of the U.S. Army CBRN School is Brigadier General Dale S. Crockett United States Army CBRN School. The Assistant Commandant is Colonel Sedrick L. Jackson. The Regimental Command Sergeant Major is CSM Raymond P. Quitugua Jr.. The Regimental Chief Warrant Officer is CW3 Humphrey B. Hills.

Former Commandants and Chiefs of Chemical

See also
Army Gas School
Human experimentation in the United States

References

External links
U.S. Army CBRN School official website.
Fort Leonard Wood Army Training Center official website.

United States Army schools
Chemical warfare facilities